Patric Young (born February 1, 1992) is an American former professional basketball player who is a free agent. He is a 6'10" (2.08 m) tall center. He played college basketball for the University of Florida.

College career
Young accepted an athletic scholarship to attend the University of Florida in Gainesville, Florida, where he was a member of coach Billy Donovan's Florida Gators men's basketball team from 2010 to 2014.  In his four-year college career at Florida, Young became the 50th 1,000-point scorer in UF history, and finished his career 27th on the all-time scoring list, with 1,307 points. He also became the 11th Gator all-time with 1,300 points and 800 rebounds. Young never missed a game in his college basketball career, becoming the second player in Florida program history to appear in 150 games. As a senior, he was named NABC Pete Newell Big Man of the Year, AP and Senior CLASS All-American, CoSIDA Academic All-American, and SEC Defensive Player of the Year. He was also a two-time All-SEC Team member, earning second-team honors from coaches and the AP in 2014, and second-team honors from the coaches in 2013. Furthermore, he became the SEC league's first three-time winner of the SEC Scholar Athlete of the Year honor, earning the recognition in 2012, 2013, and 2014.

Professional career
After going undrafted in the 2014 NBA draft, Young joined the New Orleans Pelicans for the 2014 NBA Summer League. On July 24, 2014, he signed with the Pelicans. On November 30, 2014, he was waived by the Pelicans before appearing in a game for them.

On December 3, 2014, Young signed with Galatasaray Liv Hospital of Turkey for the rest of the 2014–15 season. In 24 Turkish League games, he averaged 10.5 points and 7.9 rebounds per game.

On June 27, 2015, Young joined the Phoenix Suns for the 2015 NBA Summer League. On July 17, 2015, he signed a two-year contract with the Greek club Olympiacos. On November 12, 2015, he suffered a torn ACL in a game against Anadolu Efes, and was shut down for the rest of the season.

On July 10, 2017, Young signed with Italian club Olimpia Milano.
He was released on February 26, 2018, without ever appearing in a single game for the club due to injuries.

On December 6, 2018, Young signed a deal with Scandone Avellino.

On July 31, 2020, Young signed a deal with Hapoel Gilboa Galil in the Israeli Basketball Premier League. However, he parted ways with the team for personal reasons on October 9, 2020.

Career statistics

EuroLeague

|-
| style="text-align:left;"| 2014–15
| style="text-align:left;"| Galatasaray
| 17 || 14 || 24.5 || .602 || .000 || .600 || 6.4 || .6 || .9 || .8 || 8.7 || 13.2
|-
| style="text-align:left;"| 2015–16
|rowspan="2"|Olympiacos
| 5 || 5 || 19.4 || .714 || .000 || .667 || 5.0 || .4 || 1.2 || 2.6 || 10.8 || 17.4
|-
| style="text-align:left;"| 2016–17
| 30 || 1 || 9.4 || .500 || .000 || .615 || 2.4 || .1 || .3 || .4 || 2.7 || 4.4
|- class="sortbottom"
| style="text-align:left;"| Career
| style="text-align:left;"|
| 17 || 14 || 24.5 || .602 || .000 || .600 || 6.4 || .6 || .9 || .8 || 8.7 || 13.2

Broadcasting career 
On September 13, 2021, Young announced that he had been hired by ESPN to become a studio host for the SEC Network’s college basketball coverage.

Personal life
On June 29, 2022, Young was involved in a serious car accident in Nebraska that left him paralyzed from the waist down.

References

External links
 Patric Young at draftexpress.com
 Patric Young at eurobasket.com
 Patric Young at euroleague.net
 Patric Young at gatorzone.com
 

1992 births
Living people
American expatriate basketball people in Greece
American expatriate basketball people in Italy
American expatriate basketball people in Turkey
American men's basketball players
Basketball players from Jacksonville, Florida
Centers (basketball)
Florida Gators men's basketball players
Galatasaray S.K. (men's basketball) players
McDonald's High School All-Americans
Olympiacos B.C. players
Parade High School All-Americans (boys' basketball)
Power forwards (basketball)
S.S. Felice Scandone players